The cocoa woodcreeper (Xiphorhynchus susurrans) is a passerine bird in the woodcreeper subfamily of the ovenbird family. It was formerly considered a subspecies of the buff-throated woodcreeper (X. guttatus).

Description
It is typically 23 cm long, and weighs 37 g. The head and neck are buff-streaked dark brown, the upper back is liver-brown, and the rest of the upperparts, wings and tail are rufous. The underparts are olive-brown with buff streaks on the breast. The bill is long, black, slightly decurved, and hooked at the tip. The normal call is a loud kew-kew-kew-kew.

Distribution and habitat
The bird breeds in tropical Central and South America in Trinidad, Tobago, northern Colombia and northern Venezuela. It is a common and widespread bird of forests and cultivated land with trees.

Behaviour
The cocoa woodcreeper builds a bark-lined nest in a tree hole or hollow stump and lays two white eggs. It is an insectivore which feeds on ants and other insects and spiders. It feeds low in trees or on the ground, usually alone, but groups of up to a dozen birds will follow columns of army ants.

Systematics

The cocoa woodcreeper was formerly included in the larger buff-throated woodcreeper, X. guttatus but has been recognized as specifically distinct. Eight subspecies are normally recognized, falling into two groups. It is not quite clear how these are related to each other and to the buff-throated woodcreeper.

Subspecies
 "susurrans" group
 X. s. susurrans (Jardine, 1847) - Trinidad cocoa woodcreeper. Trinidad and Tobago, sometimes straying to the mainland.
 X. s. jardinei (Dalmas, 1900) - Eastern cocoa woodcreeper. NE Venezuela.
 X. s. margaritae Phelps, Sr. & Phelps, Jr., 1949 - Margarita cocoa woodcreeper. Isla Margarita.
 "nanus" group
 X. s. nanus (Lawrence, 1863) - Southern Lawrence's/cocoa woodcreeper. Coastward areas of E Panama south to Tolima Department, Colombia, and east to Miranda, Venezuela.
 X. s. costaricensis (Ridgway, 1888) - Central Lawrence's/cocoa woodcreeper. Coastward areas from SE Honduras to W Panama.
 X. s. confinis (Bangs, 1903) - Northern Lawrence's/cocoa woodcreeper. Caribbean slope of E Guatemala and N Honduras.
 X. s. rosenbergi Bangs, 1910 - Cauca Lawrence's/cocoa woodcreeper. Upper Cauca Valley, Colombia
 X. s. marginatus Griscom, 1927 - South Panamanian Lawrence's/cocoa woodcreeper. Pacific slope of C Panama.

References

 Remsen, J. Van (2003): 33. Cocoa Woodcreeper. In: del Hoyo, Josep; Elliott, Andrew & Sargatal, Jordi (editors): Handbook of Birds of the World, Volume 6: Broadbills to Tapaculos: 430–431, plate 35. Lynx Edicions, Barcelona. 

cocoa woodcreeper
Birds of Nicaragua
Birds of Costa Rica
Birds of Panama
Birds of Colombia
Birds of Venezuela
Birds of Trinidad and Tobago
cocoa woodcreeper